Girona Club de Hoquei is a Spanish roller hockey club from Girona, Catalonia that was established in 1940.

History
The women's team plays in the OK Liga, and it has been the championship's runner-up in 2011 and 2012. In 2012 it also reached the European League's final, lost to Gijón HC.

The men's team promoted to OK Liga for the first time ever in 2016 after three promotions in four seasons.

Season to season

Men's team

Women's team

References

External links
Official website

Sports clubs established in 1940
Catalan rink hockey clubs
Sport in Girona